Neurozerra conferta is a moth in the family Cossidae. It was described by Francis Walker in 1856. It is found in Sri Lanka, India, Taiwan, Vietnam, Thailand, Bangladesh and on the Andaman Islands.

References

Zeuzerinae
Moths described in 1856